Brunn an der Wild is a town in the district of Horn in Lower Austria, Austria.

Geography
Brunn an der Wild lies in the Waldviertel in Lower Austria, about 11 km west of Horn, Austria. About 27.47 percent of the municipality is forested.

References

External links

Cities and towns in Horn District